Zarrin Kuyeh (also Romanized as Zarrīn Kūyeh) is a village in Jereh Rural District, Jereh and Baladeh District, Kazerun County, Fars Province, Iran. At the 2006 census, its population was 278, in 55 families.

References 

Populated places in Kazerun County